Danger Ahead is a 1935 American crime drama film directed by Albert Herman, produced and released by Victory Pictures Corporation.

Plot
Captain Matthews is paid $40,000 for a silk shipment from China. The Green Eagle Café owner has the captain called away for a phone call but is robbed of the money. Local reporter sees the robbery and after a fist fight gets the money back. He runs into the local delicatessen and hides the money.  The reporter gets a headline story and gets to meet the captain's daughter. Conrad and his henchman pose as the captain to get the cash returned.

Cast

Lawrence Gray as Jerry Mason, reporter
Sheila Bromley as Lorraine Matthews, Captain's daughter
J. Farrell MacDonald as Harry Cromwell, the city editor
Fuzzy Knight as Fred Klein - butcher
Bryant Washburn as Nick Conrad - gangster
Fred Kelsey as Detective O'Brien
John Elliott as Captain Matthews
Eddie Phillips as Eddie, henchman
Arthur Loft as Pete, balding henchman
Herschel Mayall as Steve, henchman
Gordon Griffith as Chuck, henchman
Earl Dwire as Detective Sergeant
Richard Cramer as Detective Hogan
George Chesebro as First Mate Taylor

Production
This was Katzman's first film for his company Victory Pictures. Filming started on 24 June 1935.

References

External links

1935 films
1930s psychological thriller films
American crime thriller films
American black-and-white films
1930s crime thriller films
Films directed by Albert Herman
1930s English-language films
1930s American films